2008 Georgian drone shootdowns refers to several  incidents in March, April and May 2008, when Georgia's pro-Russian breakaway region of Abkhazia claimed to have shot down unmanned Georgian reconnaissance aircraft. Georgia initially denied that any of these downings took place, but made the allegations public following the April 20 shootdown carried out by a fighter jet belonging to the Russian Air Force. Involvement of the Russian military was denied by the Abkhaz separatists and Russia, with both falsely claiming that the separatists alone had accomplished the task. However, Russian military involvement was later confirmed by a UNOMIG fact finding mission which represented its results on May 26. On June 1, in a note sent to the Russian delegation at the Organization for Security and Co-operation in Europe (OSCE), Georgia recognised that two other downings of its drones had taken place in the past.

March 18 spy plane shootdown

On March 18, 2008, Abkhazia announced that around noon it had shot down an unmanned Georgian reconnaissance aircraft over the border between Ochamchira and Gali districts, near the village of Primorskoe. It said that the spy plane had subsequently crashed into sea. On the same day, the Georgian Ministry of Defence denied that the incident had taken place, although it admitted to possessing unmanned reconnaissance planes. Abkhazia reported to have recovered wreckage from the sea, stating that the spy plane had been produced by Israeli manufacturer Elbit Systems, with serial number 551. Abkhazian Deputy Minister of Defence Gari Kupalba claimed that the downed spy plane had been performing reconnaissance flights over Abkhazia since the summer of 2007.

On March 20, the Abkhazian Parliament passed a resolution in which it declared that recent Georgian actions, amongst which the violating of Abkhazian airspace through reconnaissance flights, indicated that it was preparing for another war.

April 20 spy plane shootdown

Initial reports
On April 20, Abkhazia reported that around 10 am of that day, it had shot down another spy plane over the village of Gagida in Gali district. Georgian television station Mze TV reported that this had been confirmed by Georgian State Minister for Reintegration Temur Iakobashvili, while Georgian agency InterPressNews reported that an eyewitness had seen how an unmanned aeroplane flew over the coastline near the village of Primorskoe, followed by a jet, which then shot down the unmanned plane. Still, that day the Georgian Ministry of Defence initially denied that its spy plane had been shot down, stating that it was not conducting any flights over Abkhazia, and that Abkhazian reports were misinformation. In an interview to Mze TV, State Minister for Reintegration Iakobashvili stated that Abkhazia did not possess the technical capability for shooting down unmanned aircraft. According to Iakobashvili there was information that an incident involving an explosion had taken place in the Gali district, and he confirmed that eyewitnesses had seen aircraft, but since Georgia could not send people to the site, it was impossible to determine what had happened. He denounced what had taken place as further attempts to stage a military provocation.

On April 21, Abkhazian Deputy Minister of Defence Kupalba announced that debris of the downed spy plane had been recovered and that the spy plane had been produced by Elbit Systems and that it had been of a similar type as the one shot down March 18. The wreckage was later shown on Russian TV.

Georgian reactions
Later on April 21, Georgia retracted its previous denial that a spy plane had been downed. Instead, Georgian Colonel David Nairashvili declared towards press agency Reuters that its spy plane had been downed by a Russian MIG-29 fighter jet. As evidence he presented footage which he claimed had been recorded and transmitted by a camera mounted on the spy plane. The footage showed how a jet aircraft fires a missile in the direction of the camera, after which the screen goes blank. According to Reuters, no identification markings are visible on the jet aircraft. Colonel Nairashvili further stated that according to Georgia's radar records, the MIG-29 had taken off from a base in Abkhazia and had passed into Russia after shooting down the Georgian spy plane.

In a declaration, Georgian President Mikheil Saakashvili said that the video footage constituted incontrovertible evidence that the spy plane had been shot down by a Russian MIG-29 fighter jet and that the downing constituted “unprovoked aggression against the sovereign territory of Georgia”, labelling it “an unfriendly move”.

On April 22, President Saakashvili confirmed that Georgia had bought around 40 spy planes from Israel.

On May 4, the Georgian Ministry of Defence said a group of experts from the Baltic states and the United States had completed an investigation into the circumstances of the April 20 spy plane shootdown, would release a report “in the nearest future” and that furthermore, another international group of experts would conduct a separate probe.

On May 12, speaking at a joint press briefing with visiting five EU foreign ministers in Tbilisi, Georgian president Saakashvili said:
“I want to say that recent actions by the Russian Federation are source of concern. We urge the European Union to formally investigate [...] incident involving incursion of the Russian jet into the Georgian airspace, which conducted military action”

Russian reactions
In response to Georgian accusations, Russia denied that its fighter jet had downed the Georgian spy plane, declaring that as April 20 had been a Sunday, its pilots had enjoyed a rest day and that consequently none of its jets had taken off.

On April 21, a phone conversation took place between Georgian President Saakashvili and Russian President Vladimir Putin, lasting about 40 minutes, which was described by Saakashvili as "not easy". In the conversation, Saakashvili demanded that Russia should “stop attacks on Georgia”. According to the Kremlin press office, Putin expressed bewilderment that Georgia should conduct flights with military purposes over the Abkhazian conflict zone. Putin also stressed that overflights in the conflict zone contradict the purpose and spirit of the 1994 Moscow agreement on ceasefire and separation of forces and represent a destabilising factor, leading to escalation of tensions.

Later that day, the Russian Ministry of Foreign Affairs said that Georgia's spy plane had been shot down by Abkhazian air defence forces. It also reiterated that the conducting of flights over the conflict zone constituted a violation of the ceasefire treaty.
 
“This flight of a spy plane, which can also be used for fire correction, is a violation of not only the 1994 Moscow agreement on ceasefire and separation of forces, but also the relevant resolutions of the UN Security Council. The Moscow agreement clearly reads that there should be no armed forces in the security zone, while the latest resolution of the UN Security Council, which was adopted on April 15, reads that the sides should provide that no unauthorized military activities be carried out in the security zone and the zone of restricted armament.”

The Russian Ministry of Foreign Affairs also stated that the debris of the downed spy plane revealed that it had been a Hermes 450 type unmanned aerial vehicles produced by the Israeli firm Elbit Systems, with serial number 553, and that the spy plane downed March 18 had serial number 551.

Russia's ambassador to Georgia Vyacheslav Kovalenko said on April 23 that:

“This drone was downed by the Abkhaz air defense forces. Therefore, any talk or insinuation that the plane was downed by a Russian jet is absolutely groundless.”

In a statement on April 29, the Russian Ministry of Foreign Affairs claimed on that the video footage showing a fighter jet downing a Georgian spy plane had been fabricated.

“[The video footage] does not warrant trust and raises many question marks. Experts, firstly, have noted a strange manoeuvre by the pilot of the fighter jet, who seems to have deliberately made his aircraft seen by flying beneath the drone prior to the attack.”

The Ministry also said that according to experts, the missile fired by the fighter jet was launched from a pylon attached to the edge of the wing of the airplane, but

“MIG-29 fighter jets in the possession of the Russian air force do not have their pylons attached to the edges of the wings.”

It also claimed that white smoke trails such as seen behind the missile on the footage usually occur from land-to-air missile launches, and never with air-to-air missiles.
 
“This is not a full list of inconsistencies in the obviously edited video footage. [The footage does not give] a clear picture of when and where the video was recorded. If watched carefully, one can clearly see two roads parallel to the shoreline,” the Russian Foreign Ministry said. “But there aren't such roads in the indicated area of Abkhazia’s coast. Abkhazia's famous sand beaches - 100 meters in width - are not seen in the footage, even though they can be seen by satellite.”

The Russian Foreign Ministry reiterated its position that Georgia's spy plane had been shot down by an L-39 aircraft of the Abkhazian air force and that the spy plane's presence over the conflict zone constituted a violation of the 1994 Moscow agreement on ceasefire and separation of forces.

On May 31, French newspaper Le Monde published an interview with Russian President Putin. In it, he said:

Much is spoken now about downing of several Georgian unmanned aerial vehicles over Abkhazia. But why is not anyone saying anything about the fact, that existing agreements prohibit flights over this conflict territory?

What are these flights? It's reconnaissance. And why do you conduct reconnaissance? To support military actions. Does that mean one of the sides is preparing to spill blood? Do we want that? No one wants that.

American reactions
In a statement on April 23 the United States Department of State tentatively supported the Georgian version of events:

“We reiterate our unwavering support for Georgian sovereignty and territorial integrity and are concerned by the presence of a MiG-29 aircraft in Georgian airspace without Georgian authorization, and by the use of weapons from this aircraft in shooting down an unarmed Georgian UAV.”

On May 6, the United States for the first time directly accused Russia of being behind the April 20 shootdown when White House spokeswoman Dana Perino said at a press briefing that the April 20 shootdown constituted a provocative step on the part of Russia.

Other reactions
On April 30, during the OSCE session in Vienna, the OSCE's Forum for Security Co-operation discussed the April 20 spy plane shootdown. The Chairman-in-Office, Finnish Minister of Foreign Affairs Alexander Stubb said that

“The latest events, including [...] the shooting down of a Georgian unmanned aerial vehicle over Abkhazia, Georgia, on 20 April, [...] have considerably increased tension in the region. [...] I welcome the proposal for a UN-led joint fact-finding group to investigate the incident. The OSCE fully supports UNOMIG's efforts.”

On May 12, Foreign Minister of Canada Maxime Bernier said that his country was following developments in Georgia with “great concern”:

“Recent events, such as the downing of a reconnaissance drone [...] have raised tensions and made a difficult situation worse.”

May 4 spy plane shootdowns
On May 4, both Abkhazian and Russian authorities claimed that Abkhazian air defence had shot down two more Georgian spy planes that day. According to Abkhazia, both spy planes had been shot down over the Gali district, the first at 4:06 pm local time over the village of Dikhazurga and the second at 4:51 pm local time over the village of Bargebi. The Abkhazian Ministry of Defence later also reported to have shown debris of both downed spy planes to local journalists.

Russian reactions
According to a statement of the Russian Ministry of Foreign Affairs, the two Georgian spy planes had been conducting “unauthorized flights” over Abkhazia, describing the fact that the Abkhazians would shoot them down as “natural”. Furthermore, according to the Ministry, the latest incidents demonstrated that Tbilisi had “ignored our warnings” about the danger of violating the provisions of the 1994 Moscow agreement on ceasefire and separation of forces.

“Resorting to adventures with unmanned reconnaissance planes and speeding up military preparations in the conflict zone, the authorities in Tbilisi have taken the path of deliberately escalating tension in the region.”

Georgian reactions
Georgian authorities denied that any of its spy planes had been shot down. Georgia's Ministry of Foreign Affairs stated that

“the information is yet another Russian provocation aimed at information-propagandistic support of Russia’s military intervention.”

The Ministry further denounced the fact that the Russian Ministry of Foreign Affairs had described the alleged shootdowns as “natural”:

“This indicates clearly that the Russian Federation’s so-called peacekeeping operation, carried out under cover of the CIS, has in fact turned into fiction and now represents nothing more than open military aggression against Georgia with the aim of annexing part of our territory.”

The Ministry added that Georgian spy planes would not stop flying over Abkhazia:

“[They] were flying, are flying and will continue flying over sovereign Georgian airspace to gather full information about the Russian military intervention.”

On May 5 the Georgian Ministry of Foreign Affairs notified Russia that it withdrew from its air defence cooperation treaty with Russia, originally signed in 1995.

May 5 spy plane overflight
On May 5, Abkhazian authorities claimed that early on that day they had again observed a Georgian spy plane fly over its territory, but that it had deliberately not been shot down. According to Abkhazian Minister of Defence, Merab Kishmaria:

“Despite the fact that we shot down two drones yesterday, today our radars observed again a spy plane over the Ochamchira district, which came from the direction of Georgia. At this time we did not shoot it down.”

May 8 spy plane shootdown
On May 8, Abkhazian authorities claimed to have shot down a further spy plane. According to Deputy Minister of Defence Kupalba, the Georgian spy plane was shot down over the Ochamchira district at 5:10pm local time by Abkhazian anti-aircraft systems.

On May 9, Kupalba claimed that the Georgian spy plane allegedly downed May 8 had carried an air-to-air missile.

“The ammunition it was carrying represented danger for both civilians and peacekeeping troops.”

Georgian reactions
Georgia once again denied that any shootdown had taken place, with the head of the Ministry of the interior's information and analytical department  Shota Utiashvili saying “That is a lie” and president Saakashvili declaring that “nothing has been shot down”.

On May 12, the Georgian Ministry of Internal Affairs released footage shot by its unmanned reconnaissance drone showing, what it said was, movement and deployment of the Russian troops and their military hardware in Abkhazia.

According to Utiashvili:

“Our drones are conducting reconnaissance of the Abkhaz territory to identify where the Russian and Abkhaz armed forces and military hardware are concentrated.”

Utiashvili claimed that the footage had been recorded on May 8 and he pointed out the fact that Abkhazia claimed to have shot down a spy plane on that day:

“But as you see the drone has returned and brought very valuable information. We have not lost any drone since April 20, when our unmanned aerial vehicle was shot down by the Russian jet. The Abkhaz side simply does not possess capability that could pose a threat to our unmanned aerial vehicle.”

May 12 spy plane shootdowns
On May 12, Abkhazia claimed that it had shot down yet two more spy planes over Ochamchira district. It said that the first shootdown happened around 14:16 pm local time over the village of Shesheleti and the second about an hour later over the village of Achigwara, and that debris of one of the two shootdowns had been found. According to Deputy Defence Minister Kupalba these spy planes too were Hermes 450 produced by Elbit Systems.

Officials in Tbilisi denied the report.

Russian reactions
On May 12, acting spokesman of the Russian Ministry of Foreign Affairs Boris Malakhov criticised United States diplomat Mathew Bryza for having defended the use of Georgian spy planes over Abkhazia.

“At the same time, besides the reconnaissance activities and fire correction, the unmanned aerial vehicle can carry an air-to-air missile. [...] The statements of the U.S. Deputy Assistant Secretary of State made in Tbilisi and Sukhumi are in the line of the U.S. Administration’s efforts to cover up and to shield from criticism those, whom they are actively dragging into NATO.”

On May 20, Russian Minister of Foreign Affairs Sergey Lavrov, speaking at a hearing at the Russian State Duma said

“Practical actions of the Georgian leadership, which are accompanied by provocations, [...] do not back Georgia’s claim about its readiness to build a dialogue between the conflicting sides. Georgia [...] continues flights [over the conflict zone in Abkhazia]. In particular, within past month the Abkhazian side downed seven Georgian [unmanned reconnaissance] drones,”

UNOMIG Fact-Finding Team

Findings

On May 26, the conclusions were publicised of an investigation into the spy plane downings conducted by a fact-finding team of the UN Observer Mission in Georgia (UNOMIG). It found that the fighter plane that shot down a spy plane on April 20 had indeed been Russian. The fact-finding team judged that both Georgian air radar data and the video footage were authentic. Based on the fighter jet's twin-tail marking and the location of the air intakes, it concluded that the aircraft seen on the video was either a MiG-29 or a Su-27. Given this, and given the fact that after the shootdown, the radar record showed the aircraft heading north towards Maykop/Krasnodar into Russian airspace, and in the absence of any evidence to the contrary, the fact-finding team concluded that the aircraft belonged to the Russian air force.

The fact finding mission was unable to determine whether, as Georgia claimed, the aircraft had taken off from the Bombora military airfield near Gudauta. It said that this was possible, but that another scenario was that the jet aircraft had come in at low altitude from somewhere else and then ascended in the vicinity of Gudauta.

The fact-finding mission further judged that

“a reconnaissance mission by a military aircraft, whether manned or unmanned, constituted “military action” and therefore contravened the Moscow Agreement.”

“However legitimate this purpose may seem to the Georgian side, it stands to reason that this kind of military intelligence-gathering is bound to be interpreted by the Abkhaz side as a precursor to a military operation, particularly in a period of tense relations between the sides.”

UNOMIG's fact-finding commission confirmed that debris from the March 18 and May 12 shootdowns also originated from Hermes 450 aircraft.

Georgian reactions
In reaction to the fact-finding team's report, Georgian President Saakashvili welcomed its conclusions:

“The UN issued a conclusion, which directly accuses the Russian Federation of an act of aggression against Georgia and confirms that Russian jet has bombed the Georgian territory. This is the first case when an international organization and especially UN, without general phrases, has directly pointed its finger at Russia.”

On May 27, the Georgian Ministry of Foreign Affairs said that Georgia

“categorically demands from the Russian Federation to make an official apology for the act of aggression directed against Georgia, ensure appropriate compensation for the material loss.”

The Ministry also renewed demands for an international inspection of the Gudauta military base (Bombora airfield), from which it claimed the fighter jet took off on April 20.

On May 29, Georgia's Ambassador to the United Nations Irakli Alasania labelled the April 20 shootdown “an aggressive military act” that had further undermined Russia's role of mediator and facilitator. He also stated that Georgia did not consider overflights of unmanned, unarmed reconnaissance aircraft over the conflict zone violation of the Moscow agreement, since it was Georgia's "sovereign right" to observe and monitor its territory and “illegal movement” of Abkhazian and Russian forces.

Russian reactions
On May 26, Russia again denied being responsible for the April 20 shootdown. According to Russian air force spokesman Alexander Drobishevsky:
			
“It is even pointless to speak about violation of the Georgian state border and especially about downing of the Georgian unmanned aerial vehicle.”

According to Russian ambassador in Georgia Kovalenko
			
“In any story one should look for a root cause. When we know a root cause, the consequence becomes very clear. In my opinion, in this particular case the root cause is that the drone should not have flown there. It is a very troublesome zone for now.”

In a statement on May 27, the Russian Ministry of Foreign Affairs called the evidence on which the fact-finding mission's conclusions are based "questionable":
			
“We do not mean to question competence of specialists from the UNOMIG. It is about partiality of evidence on which the entire investigation [by UNOMIG] was built – video footage and data from certain radars.”

It further claimed that the Georgian air radar data did "not coincide with those available for us”. The Ministry also stressed the fact-finding team's judgment that Georgia's reconnaissance flights constituted military action and therefore contravened the Moscow agreement:

“This very flight [of the drone on April 20] was a root cause of the incident [downing] itself.”

“Unfortunately, the Georgian side instead of stopping provocations involving flights of UAV, increased the number of [UAV’s flights]. These flights took a systematic nature, which only increase tensions in the conflict zone… It is important that UNOMIG continues investigation of the root cause of the problem.”

Security Council meeting
On May 30, the Security Council of the United Nations met to discuss the April 20 downing of Georgia's spy plane and the findings of the UNOMIG fact-finding team. The meeting had been requested by Georgia on May 29.

Absence of the Abkhazian side
Russia had originally wanted the Abkhazian side to be present at the Security Council meeting, but Georgia was strongly opposed to this. Georgian Ambassador to the United Nations Alasania said that this would be “fundamentally infringing existing arrangements under the UN-led Geneva peace process”:

“I can hardly imagine this institution allowing the representatives of the separatist insurgents, who are implicated and who are perpetrators of the ethnic cleansing to be present at this international forum. Frankly I also think that it is not in the best interests of the Russia to set this kind of precedent, because then the questions arise why can’t other representatives of the separatist movements be allowed at the UN forums.”

“So I think it is really time for the Russian Federation’s delegation in the UN to drop using this leverage at the Security Council and sabotaging the Security Council meeting because of this reason.”

Permanent Representative of Russia to the United Nations Vitaly Churkin said that Russia had given up its demand in the end because it did not want to block all discussion of the incident.

“We expressed our disappointment that there is no possibility to discuss the Abkhazian side. Without their participation it cannot be objective, full, comprehensive and serious.”

On May 30, Russian Minister of Foreign Affairs Lavrov said that it would be “senseless” to discuss the April 20 spy plane downing at the Security Council without participation of the Abkhazian side:

“The fact that they have been refused to participate in this discussion indicates that there is something dirty in this initiative.”

“[The] essence of the crisis is that the Georgian side is roughly violating its commitments. It [the April 20 incident] was not the single case; seven drones have been shot down and even more were overflying the conflict zone, which in accordance to the UN Security Council decision should not be the zone for military actions.”

Lavrov reiterated Russia's position that Georgian spy plane overflights were the root of the problem:

“This should be dealt with first; the disease itself should be cured and not its symptoms.”

American reactions
United States Deputy Representative to the United Nations Alejandro Wolff said that it was not clear from the 1994 Moscow agreement whether the spy plane overflights constituted a violation:

“We believe the ceasefire agreement of 1994, the Moscow agreement, at best is unclear on this issue. It's an interpretation as to whether a UAV reconnaissance craft that cannot be armed constitutes military action.”

“We have a separate issue, which is a conclusion now reached by the UNOMIG independent investigators that the Russian aircraft flying from Russia, flew into the Georgian territory and shot down [Georgia’s] UAVs and that is very dangerous development, highly provocative and clearly is a violation of Georgia’s sovereignty and territorial integrity.”

Georgian reactions
During the Security Council Meeting, Georgian Ambassador Alasania said that following the UNOMIG Fact-Finding Team's judgment that its spy plane flights over Abkhazia violated the 1994 Moscow agreement on ceasefire and separation of forces it had ceased them, but that they would be resumed in the event of threat.

“I openly said [at the meeting of the UN Security Council session] that since the [UNOMIG] report was issued, the Georgian side stopped overflights to honor the words of the current report. It doesn't mean that we will not use these military capabilities if the threat will occur in the region… But at this point since the report came out we’ve stopped these overflights.”

According to Alasania, the Russian explanation of the April 20 spy plane shootdown which it provided during the Security Council meeting was “not comprehensible”, nor “viable”. He further said that the Russian side had not strongly denied its involvement in the April 20 spy plane shootdown, but instead tried to shift emphasis onto the spy plane overflights.

“The largest part of the members reiterated their strong condemnation of the act of aggression against the Georgian sovereignty by the Russian military aircraft.”

Russian reactions
Russia's Ambassador to the United Nations Churkin responded to Alasania's remarks by saying:

“Ambassador Alasania chose again to put into the mouth of Security Council members the words that they have not actually used, like ‘aggression’ and stuff like that; but you know our Georgian friends are very temperamental so they tend to do that time to time.”

He also said that he regretted Alasania's remarks that Georgia reserved for itself the right to resume spy plane overflights.

“We emphasized [at the UN Security Council meeting] that one thing is clear is that flight of drone is violation and provocation that triggered the incident.”

According to Churkin, during the Security Council meeting he had pointed out “technical inconsistencies” in the Fact-Finding Team's findings, noting that nothing in the report indicated that the fighter jet had crossed into Abkhazia from the Russian Federation.

“There also was no conversation between the pilot and ground control. Experts tell me that it is virtually impossible to shoot down a drone from a fighter jet without communication between the pilot and ground control. So something is missing in the entire puzzle.”

Churkin also reiterated Russia's position that the footage used as evidence was fabricated. He added that Russia was prepared to conduct a “thorough investigation” also involving foreign experts.

Churkin repeated Russia's stance that discussions of this type at the UN are not objective without participation of the Abkhazian side, although he claimed that awareness amongst Security Council members of the need to include the Abkhazian side had increased, and he expressed hope that next time indeed the Abkhazian side would be invited.

In a statement on May 31 Russia's Ministry of Foreign Affairs declared that during the Security Council meeting, Georgia had failed to put the blame for the April 20 spy plane downing on Russia. It added:

“We have expressed our readiness to carry out a serious investigation with the involvement of foreign experts, instead of unilateral and hasty one [that was conducted by UNOMIG]. Only in this case we will believe that the truth about the April 20 incident is found.”

Abkhazian military hardware used in the spy plane shootdowns
Both Abkhazia and Russia claim that the April 20 spy plane was downed by an Abkhazian L-39 aircraft.

On May 6, Abkhazian Minister of Foreign Affairs Sergei Shamba declared that a Buk ground-to-air air defence system had been used in the downing of the Georgian spy planes. This was the first time that Abkhazian authorities officially acknowledged that Abkhazia military possessed this advanced anti-aircraft system.

According to Shamba, the Buk system was a leftover from the 1992-1993 war with Georgia.

Georgian authorities had claimed earlier that Buk systems had been transferred from Russia to Abkhazia in 2007 as part of a larger package of military support.

In response to Shamba's statement Georgian officials declared that the fact that Abkhazia possessed Buk systems constituted a violation of existing agreements. In a statement the Georgian Ministry of Foreign Affairs called on UNOMIG “to urgently launch probing into the presence of anti-aircraft defense systems and their use in Abkhazia and to immediately acquaint the international community with the results of this probe.”

References

External links
 Report of UNOMIG on the incident of 20 April involving the downing of a Georgian Unmanned Aerial Vehicle over the Zone of Conflict, UNOMIG, 2008-05-26

Drone warfare
Abkhaz–Georgian conflict
21st-century aircraft shootdown incidents
2008 in Georgia (country)
2008 in Russia
Aerial operations and battles
Battles and conflicts without fatalities
2008 in Abkhazia
2008 in international relations
March 2008 events in Asia
April 2008 events in Asia
May 2008 events in Asia